The 2015 Tai Po District Council election was held on 22 November 2015 to elect all 19 elected members to the 21-member Tai Po District Council.

Overall election results
Before election:
Change in composition:

Change in composition:

References

External links
 Election Results - Overall Results

2015 Hong Kong local elections